Sam Sullivan is a Canadian politician.

Sam or Samuel Sullivan may also refer to:

Sam Sullivan (The 5th Wave), fictional character in The 5th Wave
Samuel Sullivan, fictional character in Heroes
Samuel Sullivan (politician), Ohio politician